The Gurav are an occupational community comprising several castes. They are among the traditional service providers found in villages, for whom they act in a priest role, and are found in several states of India.

It derives from the Sanskrit plural of guru. The etymology and genealogy for the title Gurav can be derived from the Kannada word Gorava meaning a 'Shaiva mendicant'. While known as Gurav in Madhya Pradesh and Maharashtra, they are also called Gorava in Karnataka and in Gujarat.

Function 
Both Gurav women and men perform the traditional occupations of their community. They are neither cultivators nor village officers but rather providers of a service deemed necessary for the functioning of the village, as with artisans. They traditionally serve as priests, maintainers and managers in temples devoted to Shiva, mostly in the southern states of Andhra Pradesh, Karnataka, Madhya Pradesh and Maharashtra. Some act in a role similar to shamans, being intermediaries between the temple idol and the soliciting believer, and others also serve as priests to the families of the temple dancers. Their other traditional roles are also connected to Shaivite worship, such as musicianship and the sale both of leaf plates and symbolic flowers. Local testimony suggests that the Gurav also act in a religious capacity outside temple grounds: at harvest time in the Mawal region, they are called upon to provide a symbolic sprinkling of water at threshing grounds

Composition 
The Bhavika, Lingayat and Saiva are the most prominent among the distinct endogamous castes that comprise the Gurav. These groups are in turn subdivided; for example, the Saiva Gurav have Nagari, Nilakantha and Swayambhu as subcastes, while the Lingayat Gurav are split into the Hugara, Jira and Malgara.

Bhavika Gurav 
The Bhavika Gurav are found mainly in the Konkan region of Maharashtra and comprise mostly members drawn from the Kunbi caste. Most of them are literate or formally educated even in their own rituals, and the temples that they serve are very rudimentary in style.

Lingayat Gurav 
The Lingayat Gurav are found mainly in the Konkan region and on the borders between Maharashtra and Karnataka . They do not know from which caste they originate but claim to have migrated to their present regions from Karnataka when they suffered persecution after the death of Basava, the founder of their sect. They are strict vegetarians and believe their high degree of devotion to Shiva makes them superior to other Gurav subgroups. It is this zeal that also causes them to disdain being grouped with other castes.

Shaiva Gurav 
According to Jayant Bhalchandra Bapat, a Hindu priest and academic, although the Lingayat Gurav believe themselves to be superior among the various Gurav subgroups, it is the Shaiva Gurav who are most respected by the people of Maharashtra. As they belongs to Shaiva category. The members of this sub-community perform a sacred thread ceremony in accordance with Shaiva traditions.

Mostly literate and educated, the Maharashtrian members of the Shaiva Gurav developed a myth of origin in the early 19th century and prefer to call themselves Shaiva. Their self-published research, in the form of a clan history known as a jatipurana,  proposes a lineal connection with the sage Dadhichi through his son Sudarsana and thus a status. The legend says that Sudarsana was stripped of certain Vedic powers by an offended Shiva but was also granted the right to perform the puja rituals. The claims of the community to Brahminhood were accepted both by a sankaracharya (a respected authority and arbitrator of the Hindu faith) and colonial law courts but are not accepted in general Maharashtrian society, In Maharashtra Shaiva Gurav offers the first daily puja. to almost all Ganesha Tempel and Shiva Tempel.

Socio-economic status 
In areas other than Maharashtra, the Brahmin status of the Gurav is commonly accepted but they are nonetheless considered to be of a low rank in the social structure. The sociologist M. N. Srinivas noted this peculiarity of low-status Brahminhood in particular regarding the Tapodhan of Gujarat. In Maharashtra they are considered to be a Shaiva community in the Hindu ritual ranking system known as varna.

It is probable that the Gurav are among the less well-paid among the various balutedhar communities, perhaps because the product of their labours, being mostly intangible, is less apparent than that of, say, the carpenters and blacksmiths. They are not among those groups who have noticeably suffered historically from the effects of social degradation or lack of access to opportunity, although in Maharashtra they are listed among the Other Backward Classes under India's system of positive discrimination.

References 
Notes

Citations

Further reading 

Social groups of Maharashtra
Priestly castes
Shamans
Shudra castes
Other Backward Classes